Holophaea vesta is a moth of the subfamily Arctiinae. It was described by Heinrich Benno Möschler in 1877. It is found in Suriname and French Guiana.

References

Euchromiina
Moths described in 1877